Historically, a master craftsman or master tradesman (sometimes called only master or grandmaster) was a member of a guild. The title survives as the highest professional qualification in craft industries.

In the European guild system, only masters and journeymen were allowed to be members of the guild. An aspiring master would have to pass through the career chain from apprentice to journeyman before he could be elected to become a master craftsman.  He would then have to produce a sum of money and a masterpiece before he could actually join the guild.  If the masterpiece was not accepted by the masters, he was not allowed to join the guild, possibly remaining a journeyman for the rest of his life.

History 
Craftsman or Artisan was who made things or provided services. Mastercraftsman was the superior, and expert craftsman called ustad and apprentice was called shagird in Medieval India. The grand vizier of the Mughal emperor Akbar discussed their social status and importance in karkhanas.

Today's master craftsman in different countries

Germany 

In Germany, the master craftsman (Meister) is the highest professional qualification in crafts and is a state-approved grade. The certification is called Meisterbrief. The qualification includes theoretical and practical training in the craft as well as business and legal training. Additionally, it implies the qualification to train apprentices. These qualifications prepare the Meister for running their own business or alternatively for higher positions at a company. The status of master craftsmen is regulated in the German Gesetz zur Ordnung des Handwerks (Crafts and Trades Regulation Code).

Guilds have been abolished in Germany, but the ranks of apprentice (Lehrling), journeyman (Geselle) and master craftsman have been retained even through modern times. For safety-relevant crafts, e.g., electricians and chimney sweeps, any business in the trade has to be run by a master craftsman or has to employ at least one Meister.

Journeymen and master craftsmen are by law automatically members of their regional chamber of crafts (Handwerkskammer), which is a self-governing public body. The chamber organizes vocational training and oversees the examination of the journeymen and masters.

To become a master craftsman, it is usually required to have completed vocational training in the craft in which the examination should be taken, which finishes with a final examination called Gesellenprüfung (journeyman's examination). If these requirements are fulfilled, the candidate can take courses for the Meisterprüfung (master craftman's examination). The duration of the courses takes 1 to 4 years depending on the craft and on the Course. The examination includes theoretical, practical and oral parts and takes 5 to 7 days (depending on the craft). In some crafts, the creation of a masterpiece is also part of the examination.

The German Meister qualifies the holder to study for a bachelor's degree at university, whether the Meister holds a regular university entrance qualification or not. According to the German Qualifications Framework, the Meisterbrief is at the same level as a bachelor's degree, even though it is not an academic degree and thus not directly comparable.

United Kingdom 
This tradition originates in Medieval Europe. The earliest guilds were "frith" or "peace" guilds - groups bonded together for mutual protection following the breakdown of the kins, which were groups related by blood ties.

Merchant guilds – associations of international trades – were powerful in the twelfth and thirteenth centuries, but lost their ascendancy with the rise of the craft guilds – associations of master craftsmen, journeymen, apprentices and the various trades connected with a particular craft.

The College of Arms in London awarded a coat of arms of The Guild of Master Craftsmen in 1992, after four years of assessment. Designed by heraldic expert Peter Greenhill to reflect the many categories of guild membership, it features: three escutcheons (shields) to represent artists, painters and stainers; a pair of compasses opened in chevron for building, construction and carpenters; a dovetail (separating the top third of the shield from the rest) to represent cabinetmaking, woodworking and joinery; and a gavel and chisel for masons and stoneworkers. The southern keep of Lewes Castle, which overlooks the guild’s headquarters, is featured above the helmet as the crest.

United States 
While for the most part guilds as such do not exist, many trades continue the apprentice-journeyman-master model: carpenters, electricians, pipefitters and plumbers are notable examples.

See also 
 Apprenticeship
 Guild
 Vocational training

References

Notes

Citations

External links 

 Website of German craft chambers
 The Guild of Master Craftsmen
 The Woodworkers Institute
 Deutscher Qualifikationsrahmen
 Meister equivalent bachelor, German Government

Craft occupations
Guilds
Industry_(economics)